"The Marine Biologist" is the 78th episode of the American sitcom Seinfeld. It is the 14th episode of the fifth season. It was originally broadcast on NBC on February 10, 1994. In the episode, George pretends to be a marine biologist in order to impress an old crush, which puts him on the spot when they encounter a beached whale. Meanwhile, Elaine attempts to recover her electronic organizer after a renowned Russian author throws it out the window of a moving limousine. Jerry Seinfeld considers the episode one of his favorites.

Plot
While having a conversation with Elaine about his favorite T-shirt, "Golden Boy" (which, due to its age, is "dying"), Jerry tells her the novel War and Peace was originally called War, What Is it Good For? (a reference to Edwin Starr's hit song "War"). Kramer gives Elaine an electronic organizer. He has acquired a stash of 600 Titleist golf balls from a driving range and decides to hit them into the ocean.

Jerry runs into George's college crush Diane and tells her George is now a marine biologist. Intrigued, she asks Jerry for his number. George is upset because he thinks he can't convincingly pretend to be a marine biologist.

Elaine shares what Jerry told her with renowned Russian author Yuri Testikov, who is being courted by Pendant Publishing, her company. This causes an argument between Elaine, Mr. Lippman, and Testikov. When Elaine can't shut off her electronic organizer's beeping, Testikov angrily grabs it from her and tosses it out of the window of the limousine they are sharing. It hits a woman named Corinne in the head. She finds Jerry's phone number in the organizer and calls him. Corinne says she won't return Elaine's organizer until she is compensated for her hospital bill. Since Elaine destroyed her contacts book upon getting the organizer, she needs it back, but feels Testikov should pay Corinne's bill. She and Jerry meet him in his hotel room with a tape recorder hidden in her bag. They record a confession, but Testikov is irritated by the noise of the tape recorder and digs it out of Elaine's bag. He throws it out the window, hitting Corinne in the head while she waits outside the hotel.

Kramer returns home in humiliation, having missed every ball except one, and gotten sand in his clothing. While trying to get sand out of his shoe, he accidentally drops it out of his apartment window, hitting Newman. At the beach, George is called upon to use his non-existent marine biology skills to save a beached whale. Motivated by love for Diane, George approaches the whale, realizes its blowhole is obstructed, and reaches in to pull out Kramer's golf ball. George is hailed as a hero and confesses to Diane that he is not really a marine biologist. She dumps him in response. Jerry tells Elaine that in its latest run through the washing machine, Golden Boy "didn't make it", but has been replaced by its son, "Baby Blue."

Production
George's climactic whale monologue was not in Ron Hauge and Charlie Rubin's original script; it was a rewrite that show creators Larry David and Jerry Seinfeld came up with in a burst of late night inspiration. Because the monologue was written at the last minute, there was no time to rehearse it. Despite this, actor Jason Alexander's delivery on the first take was so satisfying to the show's producers that no further takes were shot.

The production crew wanted to use the animatronic whale from the then-recent film Free Willy for the scene at the beach. Due to miscommunication, the owners of the animatronic whale thought the Seinfeld crew wanted the real whale, and declined the request. The crew resorted to crafting a CGI whale. Larry David was pleased with how real the CGI whale looked, but decided that the scene would be more effective if the whale were kept off-camera.

Sequences which were filmed but deleted prior to broadcast include George giving an in-depth account of his made-up visit to the Galapagos Islands and Newman finding a mentally unhinged Kramer vacuuming non-existent sand.

Critical reception 
Rick Kushman of The Sacramento Bee listed this as one of the Top Ten Seinfeld Episodes: a "brilliantly plotted story that weaves together all kinds of silliness".

In 2009, a New Hampshire Union Leader columnist speculated that one could ask "people to name their favorite living marine biologist... and the most likely answer is George Costanza."

References

External links 
 

Seinfeld (season 5) episodes
1994 American television episodes